This article lists the progress of British tennis players at Wimbledon each year. Wimbledon is the home Grand Slam for British players, but in recent years they have not had much success. However, on 7 July 2013 Andy Murray became the first Briton to win the men's competition since Fred Perry in 1936. The last British woman to win the ladies' tournament was Virginia Wade in 1977.

Men's singles (Open Era)

See the article for each year of the Wimbledon Championships (linked in the 'Year' column) for references.

Ladies' singles (Open Era)

See the article for each year of the Wimbledon Championships (linked in the 'Year' column) for references.

References

See also 

List of British finalists at Grand Slam tennis tournaments

Wimbledon Championships
Tennis in the United Kingdom
British tennis players
United Kingdom sport-related lists
History of the London Borough of Merton